Anita Raj (born December 29, 1970) is an American developmental psychologist and global public health researcher focused on sexual and reproductive health, maternal and child health, and gender inequalities including gender-based violence, discrimination and bias. She is a Tata Chancellor Professor of Society and Health and is a professor in the Departments of Medicine and Education Studies at the University of California, San Diego. She is also the Founding Director of UCSD's Center on Gender Equity and Health.

Education
She earned a B.S. in biology (1991) from Mississippi College, and an M.S. (1995) and Ph.D. (1996) in psychology from the University of Georgia. She completed post-doctoral work at the University of Alabama, the University of Georgia, and the Boston University School of Public Health.

Career

Research 
Raj's research interests include development and evaluation of sexual, reproductive and maternal-child behavioral health interventions for socially vulnerable populations; assessment of gendered, social and cultural vulnerabilities for sexual and reproductive health concerns, intimate partner violence, and child marriage; and measurement of structural and systems level gender inequalities in health. This work includes studies in South Asia, Sub-Saharan Africa, Russia and the United States.

She is a research scientist trained in developmental psychology. Her research includes epidemiological and qualitative assessment of gendered, social, and cultural vulnerabilities, specializing in reproductive, maternal, neonatal, child, and adolescent health concerns across national settings; assessment of etiology and public health impact of gender inequities including early and child marriage, intimate partner violence and sexual assault, and son preference; development and evaluation of HIV, unintended pregnancy, and gender-based violence prevention interventions in low resource settings with socially vulnerable populations including minorities, people contending with problem substance use, and youth; and application of social and behavioral theories, including gender theories for measurement development and evaluation research. She is well known for her child marriage work in South Asia. In 2014 she was an invited panelist, asked to speak on child, early and forced marriage at the United Nations General Assembly in New York, NY.

Media 

Raj's work has been covered by popular media including the New York Times, NPR, the New York Post, and USA Today.

"Pervasive Sexual Harassment Why #MeToo Took Off Poll" - New York Times
"How Chickens and Goats Are Helping to Stop Child Marriage" - NPR, Goats and Soda
"A New Survey Finds Eighty-Percent of Women Have Experienced Sexual Harassment" - NPR, The Two Way
"WHO Finds Violence Against Women in 'Shockingly' Common" - NPR, Shots
"Nearly All Hollywood Women Say They've Been Sexually Harassed" - New York Post
"Modern Family Planning In India" - Science Daily
"Jama Study Child Marriages India, Nepal, Pakistan, Bangladesh" - Asian Scientist
"How Common Sexual Misconduct in Hollywood" - USA Today
"Tata Trusts and University of California San Diego partner to establish Tata Institute for Active Genetics and Society (TIAGS)" - PR Newswire, Cision

Publications

References

External links 

 UCSD Division of Infectious Disease and Global Public Health 
 UCSD Center on Gender Equity & Health
 

Living people
American women psychologists
20th-century American psychologists
21st-century American psychologists
American people of Indian descent
University of California, San Diego faculty
People from Jackson, Mississippi
Mississippi College alumni
University of Georgia alumni
1970 births
21st-century American women